The 1947 Colorado Buffaloes football team was an American football team that represented the University of Colorado as a member of the Mountain States Conference (MSC) during the 1947 college football season. Led by James J. Yeager in his fifth and final season as head coach, the Buffaloes compiled and overall record of 4–5 with a mark of 3–3 in conference play, tying for third place in the MSC.

Schedule

References

Colorado
Colorado Buffaloes football seasons
Colorado Buffaloes football